Pleasant Township is a township in Harvey County, Kansas, United States.  As of the 2000 census, its population was 439.

Geography
The stream of Walnut Creek runs through this township.

Cemeteries
According to the USGS, it contains one cemetery, Mission.

References

Further reading

External links
 Harvey County Website
 City-Data.com
 Harvey County Maps: Current, Historic, KDOT

Townships in Harvey County, Kansas
Townships in Kansas